Sun Yat-sen University station, is a station on Line 6 Branch of the Shenzhen Metro. It opened on 28 November 2022. Its name is derived from the nearby Shenzhen Campus of Sun Yat-sen University.

Station layout

Exits

References

Shenzhen Metro stations
Railway stations in Guangdong
Railway stations in China opened in 2022